Olena Vasylivna Myahkikh (born December 23, 1978) is a Ukrainian long track speed skater who participates in international competitions.

Personal records

Career highlights

Olympic Winter Games
2002 - Salt Lake City, 31st at 3000 m
2002 - Salt Lake City, 35th at 1000 m
2002 - Salt Lake City, 38th at 1500 m
World Sprint Championships
2006 - Heerenveen, 31st
European Allround Championships
1999 - Heerenveen, 25th
2000 - Hamar, 22nd
2001 - Baselga di Pinè, 19th
2003 - Heerenveen, 19th
2004 - Heerenveen, 19th
2005 - Heerenveen, 21st
2006 - Hamar, 22nd
2007 - Collalbo, 22nd
2008 - Kolomna,  21st
National Championships
2004 - Kyiv,  1st at 500 m
2004 - Kyiv,  2nd at 3000 m
2004 - Kyiv,  1st at 1500 m
2004 - Kyiv,  1st at 1000 m
2004 - Kyiv,  1st at 5000 m

External links
Myahkikh at Jakub Majerski's Speedskating Database
Myahkikh at SkateResults.com

1978 births
Ukrainian female speed skaters
Olympic speed skaters of Ukraine
Speed skaters at the 2002 Winter Olympics
Living people